The American Football Association (AFA) was a professional American football minor league that operated from 1977 to 1983.

The AFA was concentrated in the southern United States and served as the second tier of professional football between the World Football League, which folded in 1975, and the United States Football League, which began play in 1983. Unlike the WFL or USFL, the AFA always fashioned itself as a minor league, and never planned to rival the National Football League for "major league" status. Players were paid one percent of gross gate revenue, which often meant players were paid only menial sums for their service (often comparable to minimum wage for three hours of work), and the league struggled to acquire recognizable players.

The league played its games on Saturday nights in the summer (beginning its season Memorial Day weekend and ending in August) to avoid direct competition against other football in the fall, a move that foreshadowed the USFL's similar spring football schedule. The AFA ended operations in 1983, unable to take advantage of the strike that hit the NFL the year prior or weather the competition from the USFL.

Teams and cities represented

Many nicknames came from previous leagues, with minor alterations to avoid trademark disputes: the Steamer, Vulcans and Fire all took their names from WFL teams, while the Rockets borrowed their moniker from a Continental Football League and United Football League team of the same name.

The operations were often fly-by-night, with most teams lasting only one season (or less) before folding, and players played for a paycheck equal to one percent of the net gate receipts after expenses (In August 1980, Shreveport Times sports reporter Ron Higgins estimated the average Steamer game check to be about $35 per man).

Despite its minor-league status, the league's teams often were able to secure leases for unusually large stadiums, often those used by the WFL and the USFL: the Orlando Americans, in their lone season, played in the 70,000-seat Citrus Bowl, while the Vulcans and Magic played at similarly-sized Legion Field, Houston played at 73,000 seat Rice Stadium, and the Fire played at Soldier Field. The Mustangs played at 30,000-seat Skelly Stadium.  The Jacksonville Firebirds played in the Gator Bowl.

History
The AFA was founded in May 1977 and began to play that summer. It was formed to take advantage of the places where the WFL was the most popular, while avoiding the overspending that led to that league's demise.

Billy Kilmer, the former NFL quarterback (and coach of the AFA's Shreveport Steamer in 1979), was named commissioner in 1981. Kilmer lasted one season as commissioner, working unpaid, during which he encountered numerous problems in the AFA, including a scandal in San Antonio which a player named Robert Lee Johnson misrepresented himself as former NFL offensive lineman Randy Johnson. The Carolina Chargers, one of the league's more successful and stable teams, dropped out of the league mid-season but re-emerged in 1982 under new ownership as the Carolina Storm.

In 1982, with former San Antonio Wings executive Roger Gill at the helm, the league attempted to expand northward by absorbing other semi-pro teams in Buffalo, New York, Racine, Wisconsin and Canton, Ohio.

The USFL's securing of a TV contract, especially after the AFA had failed to do so (the AFA was only able to get a few of its teams onto local cable stations, still a nascent technology at the time), led to the AFA eventually declining into semi-pro status and folding after its 1983 season.

The AFA lasted six seasons, one of the longest runs of a minor professional football organization in the sport's history, and considered the strongest league in the era between the WFL and the USFL. The development of arena football and its numerous imitators has effectively reduced most outdoor leagues to amateur or semi-pro status.

The modern American Football Association, a sanctioning body for semi-pro and amateur football, is unrelated to the former AFA.

1977
Harry Lander and Roger Gill, from the existing San Antonio Charros amateur club, decided to create a new minor league football league and attract local investors. Five other clubs from Houston, Fort Worth, Austin, Wichita Falls, and Oklahoma City joined the Charros to establish the AFA.

The plan was to play two exhibition games, and then each team would play twelve regular-season games beginning on July 2. The players were promised 1% of each game's gate receipts.

After three games (including two preseason) where they failed to score any points, the Fort Worth Stars were forced out of the league, while the Houston franchise—which had failed to secure a home stadium, pay their league dues, or secure medical insurance for their players—folded mid-August.

The San Antonio Charros finished undefeated in the regular season and were declared league champions.

1978
The AFA entered an agreement for a loose affiliation with the California Football League for the 1978 season, that both leagues will play their normal league schedules, and at the end of the season the champions of each league will play in the "King Kong Bowl" to determine the "national champion".

Playoffs

Indicates overtime victory.

King Kong Bowl 
(September 30 at State Fair Stadium) 
San Jose Tigers 32 vs. Shreveport Steamer 6

1979
The league grow to nine teams and had plans to divide to Eastern and Western divisions, but after Tulsa Mustangs folded the remaining teams has gone from two divisions format to one, with the top four teams making the playoffs.

Playoffs

1980
The AFA started the season with eight teams and split up to Eastern and Western divisions. The league revoked Kentucky Trackers license after several cases of misconduct with four remaining weeks in the regular season. The Trackers' remaining games was filled with semi-pro teams from the Atlantic Coast League and the Dixie League, but those games did not count in AFA standings.

Playoffs

1981
Billy Kilmer was introduced as the first full-time commissioner of the American Football Association. Also, for the first time, the league expended behind southern United States, when they add the Chicago Fire.The Chargers players voted to walk out on the team four games into the season, while both Shreveport Steamer and Austin Texans folded before season end, resulting in Kilmer resignation before the American Bowl. He was replaced by AFA president Roger Gill.

During the season a member of the Orlando Americans admits he impersonated former NFL guard Randy Johnson to make the team. He was discovered when he couldn't crack the starting lineup.

Includes forfeit games.

Playoffs

1982
The AFA expanded to 18 teams, and split up to three divisions, while two teams (Florida Sun and Roanoke Valley Express) folded mid-season.
 

Includes forfeit games.

Playoffs
First Round (August 7): 
Racine 44 vs. Akron 6
Carolina 61 vs. West Virginia 18
Texas 17 vs. Oklahoma 14
Shreveport 42 vs. Georgia 35

1983
It was the seventh and final year of the AFA. The United Football Teams of America league champion - Oklahoma City Drillers - joined the league but later announced that they would play the season as a travelling team before folding altogether after two weeks. The majority of the teams followed, and the league decided that division champions Carolina and San Antonio would meet in the final American Bowl.

The Bulls knew before season's end that they would join the United States Football League as an expansion team for the 1984 season, where they played as the San Antonio Gunslingers (as the Jacksonville Bulls had already claimed rights to the "Bulls" name).

Playoffs

Notes

References

External links
Encyclopedia of Italian Football - includes all schedules of AFA teams, but includes a spurious 1977 season that may have been a predecessor league.

 
Defunct American football leagues in the United States
American football in Shreveport, Louisiana